Corgatha is a genus of moths of the family Erebidae erected by Francis Walker in 1859.

Taxonomy
The genus has previously been classified in the subfamily Acontiinae of the family Noctuidae.

Description
Its palpi are porrect (extending forward). Second joint triangularly scaled, and third joint minute. Abdomen tuftless.

Species

 Corgatha albicinctalis Walker, [1866]
 Corgatha albipunctulata Warren, 1913
 Corgatha albivertex Hampson, 1907
 Corgatha ancistrodes Turner, 1936
 Corgatha argenticosta Hampson, 1910
 Corgatha argentisparsa Hampson, 1895
 Corgatha argillacea Butler, 1879
 Corgatha argyrota Hampson, 1910
 Corgatha aroa Bethune-Baker, 1906
 Corgatha atrifalcis Hampson, 1907
 Corgatha atrimargo Hampson, 1910
 Corgatha atripuncta Warren, 1913
 Corgatha binotata Warren, 1913
 Corgatha castaneorufa Rothschild, 1915
 Corgatha chionocraspis Hampson, 1918
 Corgatha chopardi Berio, 1954
 Corgatha comorana Viette, 1981
 Corgatha constipicta Hampson, 1895
 Corgatha costalba Wileman & West 1929
 Corgatha costimacula Staudinger, 1892
 Corgatha costinotalis Moore, 1867
 Corgatha crassilineata Gaede, 1916
 Corgatha dichionistis Turner, 1902
 Corgatha dictaria Walker, 1861
 Corgatha dinawa Bethune-Baker, 1906
 Corgatha diploata Hampson, 1910
 Corgatha diplochorda Hampson, 1907
 Corgatha dipyra Turner, 1902
 Corgatha drepanodes Hampson, 1910
 Corgatha drosera Meyrick, 1891
 Corgatha emarginata Hampson, 1914
 Corgatha enispodes Hampson, 1910
 Corgatha excisa Hampson, 1894
 Corgatha figuralis Walker, [1866]
 Corgatha flavicosta Hampson, 1910
 Corgatha flavipuncta Hampson, 1910
 Corgatha funebris Viette, 1961
 Corgatha fusca Tanaka, 1973
 Corgatha fuscibasis Gaede, 1916
 Corgatha fusciceps Sugi, 1982
 Corgatha gemmifer Hampson, 1894
 Corgatha griseicosta Holloway, 1976
 Corgatha hypoxantha Hampson, 1910
 Corgatha implexata Walker, 1862
 Corgatha incerta Viette, 1961
 Corgatha inflammata Hampson, 1914
 Corgatha infrarubra Strand, 1920
 Corgatha inornata Warren, 1913
 Corgatha laginia Gaede, 1916
 Corgatha leucosticta Hampson, 1910
 Corgatha macariodes Hampson, 1910
 Corgatha marumoi Sugi, 1982
 Corgatha mazoatra Viette, 1961
 Corgatha melanistis Hampson, 1910
 Corgatha microplexia Viette, 1961
 Corgatha miltophyres Turner, 1920
 Corgatha miltopolia Turner, 1945
 Corgatha minor Moore, [1885]
 Corgatha minuta Bethune-Baker, 1906
 Corgatha molybdophaes Turner, 1936
 Corgatha nabalua Holloway, 1976
 Corgatha neona Viette, 1961
 Corgatha nigricosta Warren, 1913
 Corgatha nitens Butler, 1879
 Corgatha niveicosta Hampson, 1910
 Corgatha obsoleta Marumo, 1936
 Corgatha ochrida Hampson, 1918
 Corgatha ochrobapta Turner, 1941
 Corgatha odontota D. S. Fletcher, 1961
 Corgatha olivata Hampson, 1902
 Corgatha omopis Meyrick, 1902
 Corgatha omopisoides Berio, 1954
 Corgatha ozolica Hampson, 1910
 Corgatha ozolicoides Berio, 1954
 Corgatha peroma Viette, 1961
 Corgatha pleuroplaca Turner, 1936
 Corgatha poliostrota Hampson, 1914
 Corgatha porphyrea Hampson, 1910
 Corgatha producta Hampson, 1902
 Corgatha pusilla Swinhoe, 1903
 Corgatha pygmaea Wileman, 1911
 Corgatha regula Gaede, 1916
 Corgatha rimosa Viette, 1961
 Corgatha roseocrea Viette, 1961
 Corgatha rubecula Warren, 1913
 Corgatha rubra Hampson, 1891
 Corgatha semipardata Walker, 1861
 Corgatha sideropasta Turner, 1936
 Corgatha squamigera Warren, 1913
 Corgatha subindicata Kenrick, 1917
 Corgatha submacariodes Berio, 1960
 Corgatha tafana Viette, 1976
 Corgatha tenuilineata Gaede, 1916
 Corgatha terracotta Hampson, 1910
 Corgatha thyridoides Kenrick, 1917
 Corgatha tornalis Wileman, 1915
 Corgatha trichogyia Hampson, 1907
 Corgatha uniformis Berio, 1960
 Corgatha vanjamanitra Viette, 1981
 Corgatha variegata Bethune-Baker, 1906
 Corgatha xanthobela Hampson, 1918
 Corgatha zonalis Walker, [1859]

References

Boletobiinae
Noctuoidea genera